The Modern School Movement: Anarchism and Education in the United States is a history book about Ferrer Schools by Paul Avrich.

References

External links 

 

1980 non-fiction books
AK Press books
American history books
Books by Paul Avrich
English-language books
History books about anarchism
History books about education
History of education in the United States
Princeton University Press books
Ferrer Center and Colony